Surakshya Panta (Nepali: सुरक्षा पन्त) is a Nepalese actress and model. She debuted as an actress from Alok Nembang's 2015 Ajhai Pani in a supporting role. Panta rose to fame after her role in Dhanapati. Since then, she has worked in critically acclaimed films like Gopi and Aama.

Personal life 
Surakshya Panta was born in Butwal, Nepal.

Panta married her longtime boyfriend, Manav Subedi on March 2023, they were in relationship for six years.

Career

Film debut and commercial success (2015–2018)
Panta made her acting debut with late Alok Nembang's last film Ajhai Pani (2015) where she played the role of Shaili in the supporting role alongside Sudarshan Thapa and Pooja Sharma. The film was average on the box office and the film received mostly positive feedback from the audience however Panta's role went unnoticed.

Later after nearly two years she appeared in Dipendra K Khanal's Dhanapati (2017) film where she appeared in the lead role portraying the role of Dhanapati's wife. She appeared with lead actor Khagendra Lamichhane. Upon release, the film became one of the blockbuster film in Nepal. The film managed to earn 10 Million Nepalese rupee (1 core) in just two days. Her role in Dhanapati received highly positive feedback from the Nepalese audience and critics.

After her blockbuster film Dhanapati, later in 2018 she appeared on Bhaire (2018), the first collaboration between Dayahang Rai, Barsha Siwakoti and Sunil Thapa. In the film she appears as the love interest of Dayahang Rai. The film flopped at the box office however the film's producers held success party for unknown reasons.

After the unsuccessful film she collaborated with Naresh Kumar Kc in Romeo & Muna (2018), where she portrayed the role of a nurse name Pirya. In the film she appears in a supporting role alongside Shristi Shrestha and Vinay Shrestha. Then in late 2018 she appeared in Changa Chet in the lead role. Her role in the film received mostly positive feedback and critic The Kathmandu Post saying "... Surakshya Panta's character, Manisha, has a more prominent role..."

In 2019, Panta appeared with Bipin Karki in Gopi (2019) where she appears as Gopi (Bipin Karki)'s romantic interest.

she has worked in critically acclaimed films like Aama (2019).

Filmography

Films

Music videos 
2021 - Ye Ni Barai

2022 - Pir

Awards

References

External links 
 

Nepalese film actresses
Living people
Nepalese female models
21st-century Nepalese actresses
People from Butwal
1989 births